Belmont Public Schools is a school district that serves Belmont, Massachusetts, United States.

Schools
There are four public elementary schools in Belmont: the Burbank, Butler, Winn Brook, and Wellington schools, with the Wellington Elementary having been rebuilt in 2011. Two other public elementary schools, Payson Park and Kendall, burned down in the 1970s and 1990s, respectively. There is one public middle school, the Winthrop Louis Chenery Middle School (W.L. Chenery Middle School) which burned down in 1995, but was rebuilt later, and one public high school, Belmont High School.  Belmont has had many school fires; in the town's history, four schools have been partially or completely destroyed by fire, as was one former school (the Kendall), which was being used as an arts center at the time.

The transition from public elementary school to middle school in Belmont occurs from 4th to 5th grade, slightly earlier than in most communities (which transition from 5th to 6th grade).  The W.L. Chenery Middle school, slated for demolition and rebuilding at the time, was destroyed by fire in 1995.  When the new school opened in the fall of 1997, it was expanded to include the 5th grade (which had previously been housed in the town's elementary schools) in addition to grades 6 through 8.

In coming years, the town of Belmont has planned to rebuild their high school and make it into a 7-12th grade school. The middle school (W.L. Chenery), will become a 4th to 6th grade school, and the four elementary schools will become K through 3rd grade.

The W.L. Chenery Middle School's teams are all called the "Cheetahs", and Belmont High School's teams are all called the "Marauders".

External links
 

School districts in Massachusetts
Belmont, Massachusetts
Education in Middlesex County, Massachusetts